Simone Malacarne (born 23 February 1989) is an Italian footballer who plays for Treviso.

Biography
Malacarne started his career at A.C. Milan. He then moved to Pizzighettone and then Cremonese. On 23 July 2010 he was loaned to Viareggio. He only played 18 times in regular season but started in both legs of the relegation playoffs. He also played 4 times in the cup.

In July 2011 he was signed by Treviso.

References

External links
 Football.it Profile 
 

Italian footballers
A.C. Milan players
A.S. Pizzighettone players
U.S. Cremonese players
F.C. Esperia Viareggio players
Association football defenders
1989 births
Living people